Putaw is a village in Kyain Seikgyi Township, Kawkareik District, in the Kayin State of Myanmar.

References

External links
 "Putaw Map — Satellite Images of Phabya" Maplandia World Gazetteer
 

 
Populated places in Kayin State